DIY is a global interest based community designed specifically for kids. It is a platform that houses a variety of multi-media content designed to teach children various skills. Each user has their personal profile with an avatar and bio, and are allowed to share creations and accomplishments with friends.

DIY is also COPPA Certified and is a safety-first model that promotes community building and learning by experimenting in the real world.

History
DIY was originally founded by Vimeo co-founder Zach Klein, Isaiah Saxon, Andrew Sliwinski, and Daren Rabinovitch in May 2012. DIY was later acquired by Kyt Technologies Pte. Ltd. in February 2021, founded by Bhavik Rathod and Tripti Ahuja.

Description
DIY members can choose from an ever-growing list of exclusively designed courses, challenges, activities, workshops and earn experience points and skill badges on their completion. DIY also features a child-friendly social community that lets its members explore and post their work, connect with like-minded peers around the world, and engage in fun activities together.

Each kid on DIY gets a profile, an avatar, and a completely private and secure user name as well as a digital portfolio in which to collect, store and display all the badges they earn while completing the different challenges and projects throughout the platform. This also helps them build a digital portfolio that can be academically and professionally referenced in terms of skill development.

As of June 2021, DIY has had over 750,000 registered children.

DIY Experience Highlights 
How-To Videos: Each set of activities has a video created by moderators explaining the end goals and a few examples of how those can be achieved.

Courses: The courses tackle concepts in a way that is easy for children to grasp, and the information is given in bite-sized video units so that the learning is simple, fun, and easy to retain.

Daily Challenges: Several challenges go out every day and are posed by moderators to the DIY community at large. DIY members then take on the ones that interest them and post their findings and creations in whichever format they choose back on the platform. Challenges can also be posed by DIY members to their peers.

Live Challenges: These challenges happen over a secure live stream where moderators take the DIY members through all the steps to complete the posed challenge or project.

Skills and Badges: On completion of challenges, DIY members earn Skill points or XPs. These points help the members to earn different Skill Badges on achieving pre-decided targets.

Mentors: Some of the smartest, most talented experts across fields of creativity are brought in, from around the world to create courses. These range from baking, sketching, cartooning, playing instruments, gaming, animation, and more.

Funding 
Kyt Technologies Pte. Ltd raised $7.5 million in a Series A funding round. The investment is led by Alpha Wave Incubation (AWI), a venture fund managed by Falcon Edge Capital. Sequoia Capital India’s Surge, January Capital, Titan Capital and other angel investors also participated in the round.

References

External links
Social media: Instagram, Youtube, Pinterest, Twitter, LinkedIn, Facebook

American children's websites
Internet properties established in 2012